Charles Budts (born 9 March 1893, date of death unknown) was a Belgian racing cyclist. He rode in the 1923 Tour de France.

References

1893 births
Year of death missing
Belgian male cyclists
Place of birth missing